Xuhui District is a core urban district of Shanghai.

The Xuhui District is named after its namesake, the historic area of Xujiahui. Xujiahui was historically land owned by Ming dynasty bureaucrat and scientist Xu Guangqi, and later donated to the Roman Catholic Church. It and Luwan District jointly formed the core of Catholic Shanghai, centered in the former French Concession of Shanghai. Vestiges of the French influence can still be seen in the St. Ignatius Cathedral of Shanghai, Xuhui College, the Xujiahui Observatory, and some remaining boulevards and French-style districts.

Parts of today's Xuhui District were once the premier residential districts of Shanghai. The former french neighborhoods in parts of Xuhui today constitute some of the city´s most popular café areas, including places such as pedestrian Tianzifang. After the revolution, however, the large estates near Xujiahui were turned into factories.  In the 1990s, the Shanghai municipal government developed the district as a commercial zone. A once-prominent commercial area in the district was the Xiangyang Crafts and Gifts Market, a haven for souvenirs and intellectual property-infringing products; it was closed on June 30, 2006 by municipal authorities.

Xujiahui itself has been redeveloped as a financial center, with a proliferation of large-scale shopping centers and department stores, and is now a major shopping destination in the city with shopping malls such as Grand Gateway Shanghai and Pacific Sogo.

The educational tradition begun by Jesuits in Xuhui continues with Shanghai Jiao Tong University, the premier university in China. The district also has some of the best secondary schools in the municipality, such as South West Weiyu Middle School, Shanghai High School and Nanyang Model High School.

A number of former residences of prominent personalities remain, including Soong Ching-ling and Sun Yat-sen's former residence. Yao Ming of Houston Rockets was a resident of the district. Luo "Ferrari 430" Feichi lives in Xuhui.

Xuhui District has 12 subdistricts and two townships.

Economy 
Home Inn has its headquarters in Xuhui. Yum China has its headquarters in the Yum China Building in Xuhui District. Toei Animation Shanghai has its head office in Unit 807 of Feidiao International Plaza in the district.

miHoYo has its headquarters in Xuhui.

Yoozoo Games is headquartered in Xuhui.

Previously Web International English had its headquarters in Xuhui.

Township-level subdivisions 
Xuhui District has twelve subdistricts, one town and one special township-level division.

Transportation

Metro 
Xuhui is currently served by seven metro lines operated by Shanghai Metro:
  - Jinjiang Park, Shanghai South Railway Station , Caobao Road, Shanghai Indoor Stadium , Xujiahui , Hengshan Road, Changshu Road 
  - Shanghai South Railway Station , Shilong Road, Longcao Road, Caoxi Road, Yishan Road 
  - Yishan Road , Shanghai Stadium
  - Changshu Road , Zhaojiabang Road , Dong'an Road , Middle Longhua Road
  - Caohejing Hi-Tech Park, Guilin Road, Yishan Road , Xujiahui , Zhaojiabang Road , Jiashan Road
  - Jiaotong University , Shanghai Library
  - Longyao Road, Yunjin Road, Longhua, Shanghai Swimming Center, Xujiahui

Suburban Railway
Xuhui is currently served by one suburban railway operated by China Railway Shanghai Group.

  -  Shanghai South railway station

Education

Schools in Xuhui District include:

University: 
Shanghai Jiao Tong University
East China University of Science and Technology
Shanghai Normal University
 Shanghai University of Traditional Chinese Medicine
Shanghai Conservatory of Music

High schools:
  (上海市南洋模范中学)
  (上海市南洋中学)
  (上海市徐匯中學)
  (上海市位育高级中学)
 Shanghai Southwest Weiyu Middle School
 Shanghai High School
 Shanghai No. 2 High School
 Shanghai Fifty-forth High School (上海市第五十四中学)
  (上海师范大学附属中学) original campus

Climate 

Xuhui has a humid subtropical climate (Köppen climate classification Cfa).

References

Further reading

External links 

 Xuhui District Education Bureau
 Exchanges with Logan City, Australia

See also 

 Shanghai Corniche
 Xu Guangqi
 Xujiahui

 
Districts of Shanghai
Xu Guangqi